Idzi Jan Panic (born 1952 in Wodzisław Śląski) is Polish historian, professor at the University of Silesia. He is specializing in history of Cieszyn Silesia and medieval Poland.

He graduated from the University of Silesia in Katowice in 1976 and gained a Ph.D. from this university in 1980. In 1999 Panic gained the title of professor.

His articles were published in "Studia Historyczne", "Sobótka. Śląski Kwartalnik Historyczny", "Pamiętnik Cieszyński" and "Těšínsko".

Works 
 Księstwo Cieszyńskie w średniowieczu. Studia z dziejów politycznych i społecznych (1988)
 Historia osadnictwa w księstwie opolskim we wczesnym średniowieczu (1992)
 Początki Węgier. Polityczne aspekty formowania się państwa i społeczeństwa węgierskiego w końcu IX i w pierwszej połowie X wieku (1995)
 Książę cieszyński Przemysław Noszak (* ok. 1332/1336 - + 1410) (1996) - political biography
 Ostatnie lata Wielkich Moraw (2000)
 Poczet Piastów i Piastówien cieszyńskich (2002)
 Żory w czasach Przemyślidów i Habsburgów. Z badań nad historią miasta w latach 1327-1742 (2002)
 Dzieje Górek Wielkich i Małych (2005)
 Studia z dziejów Skoczowa w czasach piastowskich (2005)
 Zachodniosłowiańska nazwa "Niemcy" w świetle źródeł średniowiecznych (2007)
 Dzieje Cieszyna od pradziejów do czasów współczesnych (2010) - editor
 Tajemnica Całunu (2010)
 Jak my ongiś godali: język mieszkańców Górnego Śląska od średniowiecza do połowy XIX wieku (2015)
 Język mieszkańców Śląska Cieszyńskiego od średniowiecza do połowy XIX wieku (2016)

References 
 
 

Living people
20th-century Polish historians
Polish male non-fiction writers
1952 births
University of Silesia in Katowice alumni
Academic staff of the University of Silesia in Katowice
People from Wodzisław Śląski
People from Cieszyn Silesia
21st-century Polish historians
20th-century Polish male writers
Historians of Poland
Polish medievalists